Ellen Tigh is a fictional character from the re-imagined Battlestar Galactica series. She is played by the actress Kate Vernon.

Overview 

Ellen Tigh is the wife of Colonel Saul Tigh. At the beginning of the series, he believes she has been killed during the Cylon attack of the Colonies while he was on Galactica. In the original miniseries, a picture of her (portrayed by the wife of series producer David Eick rather than Kate Vernon) is seen being burned by Saul, but apart from this, she does not appear until midway through the first season in the episode "Tigh Me Up, Tigh Me Down". Though they try to reconcile after their reunion, her previous sexual infidelity strained their relationship.

Ellen Tigh claims to have been rescued by an unknown hero and brought onto the last flight off Picon after she was knocked unconscious when Cylons attacked the airport. In the weeks after the exodus of the refugee fleet, she is on board the Rising Star, but during the week before her reunion with her husband, the crew did not remember seeing or administering medical care to her. Thus, William Adama has her blood tested by Gaius Baltar, who tells Adama and Laura Roslin she is human, but in a conversation with Six, he indicates he may have lied.  In Battlestar Galactica: The Plan it is revealed exactly what happened: she was in a bar on Picon talking to a mysterious stranger (a Cavil who never identified himself) when the nuclear attacks happened and she huddled with the Cavil. She was severely injured by the blast that destroyed the bar, but survived and Cavil kept her alive as he felt she hadn't learned her "lesson".  Cavil and Ellen ended up on a Raptor and she ended up on the Rising Star recovering from her severe injuries.  Cavil visited her during the series of attacks being launched every 33 minutes against the fleet, and talked about the Final Five and how only four were in the fleet. Ellen slipped in and out of consciousness and apparently didn't hear him or register what he was saying. The Cavil eventually set himself up on Galactica as a clergyman with Ellen being unaware of his identity for a long time.

Ellen enjoys flirting with various men and working to enhance her and Saul's personal position. During the first Quorum of Twelve assembly, she shakes hands with terrorist-turned-politician Tom Zarek immediately after her husband refuses to. She explains  this is to get their picture in the media. Later, she tells Zarek where to find an imprisoned agent he had sent to kill President Roslin; the agent soon ends up dead. It is suspected Ellen killed the would-be-assassin when Zarek tells Roslin he was not responsible for the agent's death. Ellen is promiscuous; according to Adama, she "slept with half the fleet while Saul was in space."

Ellen also acts as a Lady Macbeth type figure to her husband. When Adama was hospitalized after his attempted assassination, it is Ellen who convinces Saul to take control of the fleet and declare martial law. When Saul's brief reign comes to a disaster, Ellen scolds her husband heavily for not having the will to take control. Saul blames Ellen for manipulating him, though she counters by saying she did what she did for the both of them.

In the beginning of Season 3, in an attempt to gain information for the human insurgency on New Caprica, as well as trying to secure the release of her husband, Ellen Tigh had several sexual encounters with a Cavil-model Cylon. This model also uses Colonel Tigh as leverage against her to gain information about the insurgency, leading to the Cylon ambush on Lt. Sharon Agathon's marine landing on New Caprica. Her treachery is revealed when a dead Cylon is found with directions to the landing site written in the hand of Samuel Anders, one of the Resistance leaders. Ellen had offered to burn these instructions, but instead burned other papers.

While her husband knows she has done this out of love for him, he also knows any betrayal of the Resistance is punishable by death, and Anders warns other members of the Resistance will kill Ellen themselves if Saul does not. While holding her and telling her he loves her, he gives her a poisoned drink; she dies seconds later. In postings made to the Sci Fi Channel's message boards, Vernon has said Ellen knew her husband poisoned her drink and she would soon die.

Saul Tigh has visions of Caprica Six as his own wife in the episode "Escape Velocity" and subsequent episodes in Season 4.

In "Sometimes a Great Notion", it is revealed Ellen is the twelfth Cylon and, like the other four of the Final Five, she had a life on Earth 2,000 years prior. Battlestar showrunner Ron Moore comments: "[Ellen and Saul Tigh have] always been Cylons, and there’s something profound about that. They’re a married couple who just have to go at it periodically and just have major issues and major problems. But the bond between the two of them was something that literally could not be broken. And I thought that was a really interesting and ultimately very positive thing to say."

In "No Exit" it is revealed  Ellen Tigh and the other Final Five Cylons (Saul Tigh, Tory Foster, Samuel Anders, and Galen Tyrol) were working on Earth to recreate resurrection technology, which had been lost to the thirteenth tribe after they left Kobol and learned to sexually reproduce.  After Earth was destroyed by their version of the Centurions, the Final Five were resurrected aboard a ship they had placed in orbit.  Ellen and the other Final Five Cylons travelled to the remaining twelve colonies to warn them of the dangers of artificial intelligence, namely that they should treat their creations with respect.  Without FTL drives, their journey to the colonies took several thousand years, although they experienced a minimal passage of time due to the relativistic nature of their travel.

When Ellen and the other Final Five Cylons reached the colonies, the Cylon War had already begun.  To end the war with the humans, Ellen offered to build humanoid models for the Cylons and give them resurrection technology.  Her first creation, Cavil, (whom she modelled after the image of her own father, John) became sadistic and believed Ellen favored a later model, Daniel, over him.  Cavil poisoned the genetic code of the Daniel model, effectively ending his line, and killed the Final Five Cylons.  Upon their resurrection, he blocked access to their original memories and placed them in the twelve colonies to witness firsthand the evils of humanity while thinking themselves to be human.

After she is killed for treason against the resistance on New Caprica, Ellen resurrects aboard a Cylon ship, where John Cavil holds her prisoner. However, by downloading into a new body, she regains the memories that Cavil had blocked decades earlier. This newly regained knowledge and wisdom gained over many lifetimes at first seems to alter her personal character to one of greater magnanimity born of a wider view of the universe than that granted by a single lifetime as a human.

After the Resurrection Hub is destroyed, Cavil attempts to acquire Ellen's knowledge of resurrection technology. Ellen in the absence of the other four is unable to help Cavil, and rebukes his assertion the bodies she had designed for the humanoid Cylons were imperfect. Unlike Cavil who despises his human traits as weaknesses, Ellen argues humans, for all their imperfections, have something real and precious: Love, compassion, creativity, emotion.

Ellen tries without success to convince him the events that had occurred after the destruction of the Twelve Colonies had been orchestrated by "the one true god". She also tells him she still loves him because she created him. Cavil decides to kill Ellen and recover the information from her brain, however, Ellen escapes with the help of Sharon "Boomer" Valerii.  Once she is back on Galactica among humans in "Deadlock", it becomes clear that she is still a fallible person, as her jealousy over her husband's bond with William Adama leads her to give a deadlock-breaking vote in favor of the rebel Cylons and Final Five leaving the human fleet to go in their own direction. This forces Saul to declare his intention to stay on Galactica anyway and causes Caprica-Six to doubt his love for her, seemingly leading to the miscarriage of Saul and Six's unborn child Liam. Though initially furious to learn that Six was pregnant, as Ellen and Tigh tried for years unsuccessfully to have children, she is remorseful over the unintended consequences of her manipulation, and reveals she didn't really want to leave Galactica.

However, in "Someone to Watch Over Me," it is revealed that Cavil orchestrated her escape so that Boomer could abduct the hybrid child Hera and return with her to him. Later in the episode, Ellen observes that something has been manipulating everyone and everything that has so far occurred, which may demonstrate a greater awareness than demonstrated by any other character. She is later seen discussing with Tory Foster the mission to The Colony to rescue Hera, and volunteers the Final Five to go, much to Tory's dismay ("Daybreak").

During the battle she, Tory, and Tyrol take care of Anders, who has become the Galactica's Hybrid, and Ellen stays by his side during everything. She is shocked to learn Tory murdered Cally, but both she and Tigh forgive Tyrol for killing her in revenge. She and Saul rekindle their relationship and decide to spend the rest of their lives together on humanity's new homeworld.

See also
List of Battlestar Galactica (re-imagined series) episodes

References

External links
Ellen Tigh at the Battlestar Wiki

Battlestar Galactica (2004 TV series) characters
Cylons
Fictional female scientists
Fictional cyborgs
Fictional gynoids
Television characters introduced in 2004